Clement Mary Hofbauer  (26 December 1751 – 15 March 1820) was a Moravian hermit and later a priest of the Redemptorist congregation. He established the presence of his congregation, founded in Italy, north of the Alps, for which he is considered a co-founder of the congregation. He was greatly known for his lifelong dedication to the care of the poor during a tumultuous period of Europe's history, which left thousands in destitution. He worked to care for the Polish people, until he was expelled from there and moved to Austria.

Hofbauer has been declared a saint by the Catholic Church. Due to his extensive service in that city, he is called the Apostle of Vienna, of which he is a co-patron saint.

Life

Early life 
He was born Johannes ("Hansl") Hofbauer on the feast of Saint Stephen (December 26) 1751, in Taßwitz (now Tasovice), in the Znojmo District of the Moravian region of what is now the Czech Republic. He was the ninth of twelve children born to Maria Steer and Paul Hofbauer (originally Pavel Dvořák, who had changed the family name from the Czech "Dvořák" to the German "Hofbauer"). His father was a grazier and butcher.

The son of a poor widow, his father having died when he was six years old, Hofbauer had little chance to go away to a seminary or join a religious order. He began to study Latin at the home of the local parish priest. It was to be the first step on Hofbauer's long road to the priesthood. The period of study ended abruptly with the death of the pastor when Hofbauer was just fourteen. The new pastor did not have time to help him with the language studies.

Baker and hermit

Unable to continue studying for the priesthood, Hofbauer had to learn a trade. He was sent to become an apprentice in a bakery in the local capital of Znojmo (in German called Znaim) in 1767. In 1770, he went to work in the bakery of the priory in Brück of the Premonstratensian canons regular, also known as the White Canons. At that time, the effects of war and famine were sending many homeless and hungry people to the priory for help. Hofbauer worked day and night to feed the poor people who came to the priory door. He worked as a servant at the priory until 1775, when he spent time living as a hermit. He lived that life briefly until the Emperor Joseph II, a proponent of enlightened absolutism, abolished all hermitages in the Habsburg Empire. Hofbauer then went to Vienna, where he worked once more as a baker.

In 1782, after a pilgrimage to Rome, Hofbauer found his way to Tivoli, Italy. He decided to become a hermit at the local shrine of Our Lady of Quintiliolo, under the patronage of the local bishop, Barnabas Chiaramonte (later Pope Pius VII), who clothed him in the religious habit of a hermit. It was at this time that Hofbauer took the name of Clement Mary: Clement, most likely after St. Clement of Rome, and Mary in honor of Mary, mother of Jesus. As a hermit, Hofbauer prayed for himself and for all the people in the world who forgot to pray. He worked at the shrine and assisted the pilgrims who came. In less than six months he left Quintiliolo. He realized the need to pray for people was a good work, but it was still not the priesthood that he wanted so badly.

Hofbauer returned to the priory at Brück to bake bread and to begin the study of Latin once again. At the age of 29, due to the sponsorship of two women he met while serving Mass at the cathedral, Hofbauer entered the University of Vienna. Since Emperor Joseph's government had closed all seminaries, students for the priesthood had to study at government-controlled universities. Hofbauer was frustrated by the theology courses that were permeated by Josephinism, rationalism, and other outlooks and teachings he found questionable. He completed his studies in philosophy by the year 1784, but he could proceed no further toward ordination, however, as the Emperor had also forbidden religious communities to accept new candidates.

A Redemptorist
During another pilgrimage in 1784 made on foot, Hofbauer and his traveling companion, Thaddäus Hübl, decided to join a religious community. The two seminarians were accepted into the Redemptorist novitiate at the Community of San Giuliano in Rome. On the feast of Saint Joseph, 19 March 1785, Hofbauer and Hübl became Redemptorists, publicly professing to live the vows of poverty, chastity, and obedience. Ten days later they were ordained to the priesthood at the Cathedral of Alatri.

A few months after their ordination the two Germanic Redemptorists were summoned by their Superior General, Father de Paola. They were told to return to their homeland across the Alps and establish the Congregation of the Most Holy Redeemer north of the Alps.

Mission to Poland

Warsaw

The political situation caused by the Emperor did not allow Hofbauer to remain in his own country. Emperor Joseph II, who had closed over 1,000 monasteries and convents, was not about to allow a new religious institute to establish a foundation within his domain. Realizing this, the two Redemptorists moved on to the Polish–Lithuanian Commonwealth (present-day Poland). It was February 1787 when they reached Warsaw, a city of 124,000 people. Although there were 160 churches plus 20 monasteries and convents in the city, there was still opportunity for work: the people were poor and uneducated; their houses were in need of repair. Many had turned from Catholicism to Freemasonry. Hofbauer and his companions worked to help restore Catholic faith.

Poland was likewise in the midst of great political turmoil at the time of Hofbauer's arrival in 1787. King Stanislaus II was virtually a puppet in the hands of Catherine II of Russia. Fifteen years earlier, the first partition of the country had taken place—with Austria, Russia, and Prussia dividing the spoils. A similar partition was to occur again in 1793 and for a third time in 1795. Napoleon and his great army of conquest marching through Europe added to the political tension. During Hofbauer's 21 years in Warsaw, there was hardly a peaceful moment.

On their journey to Poland, the two new Redemptorist priests were joined by Peter Kunzmann, a fellow baker who had accompanied Hansl on a pilgrimage. He became the first Redemptorist lay brother from outside Italy. Together they arrived in Warsaw with no money; Hofbauer had given the last three silver coins to beggars along the way. They met with the apostolic delegate, Archbishop Saluzzo, who put them in charge of St. Benno's Church to work with the German-speaking people of Warsaw. As they learned the new language, the Redemptorists expanded their apostolate to the people who lived in the area of St. Benno's.

When Hofbauer saw a homeless boy on the street, he brought him to the rectory, cleaned him up, fed him, and then taught him a trade and instructed him in the Christian way of life. When the number of boys grew too large for the rectory, Hofbauer opened the Child Jesus Refuge for his homeless boys. To keep the boys fed and clothed, he had to beg constantly. He did so unashamedly. Going into a bakery to buy a loaf of bread he came upon a master baker without an assistant. Hofbauer spent the day working at the dough trough and the oven, using all his old baking skills. He got bread for his boys that day and for many days to come.

On another occasion, legend has it that he went begging to a local pub. When Hofbauer asked for a donation, one of the patrons scornfully spat beer into Hofbauer's face. Wiping off the beer, he responded, "That was for me. Now what do you have for my boys?" The men in the bar were so astounded by the response that they gave Hofbauer more than 100 silver coins.

When the Redemptorists first opened their church they preached to empty benches. The people found it hard to put their trust in these foreign priests. It took several years for the Redemptorists to gain the trust of the people, but in time St. Benno's became the thriving center of the Catholic Church in Warsaw.

In 1791, four years after their arrival, the Redemptorists enlarged the children's refuge into an academy. A boarding school had been opened for young girls under the direction of some noble Warsaw women. The number of orphan boys continued to grow steadily. Money to finance all this came from some regular benefactors and many other people who were willing to help in different ways, but Hofbauer still had to beg from door to door seeking help for his many orphans.

In the church, Hofbauer and the community of five Redemptorist priests and three lay brothers began what they called the Perpetual Mission. Instead of celebrating only a morning Mass in the church on a weekday, they conducted a full-scale mission every day of the year. One could attend St. Benno's every day and be able to hear five sermons both in German and Polish. There were three High Masses, the office of the Blessed Virgin Mary, public visits to the Blessed Sacrament, the Way of the Cross, vespers, prayer services, and litanies. And priests were available for confessions all hours of the day and night. In 1793, Hofbauer was made vicar-general of the Congregation north of the Alps. With Warsaw as center, he undertook the foundation of new establishments of the Congregation in Germany and in Switzerland.

By the year 1800, the growth could be seen both in the work at the church and in the Redemptorist community. Reception of the sacraments jumped from 2,000 (in 1787) to over 100,000. The number of men serving at St. Benno's had grown to 21 Redemptorist priests and seven lay brothers. There were also five novices and four Polish seminarians.

All this work was done under less-than-ideal conditions. The three partitions of Poland brought about great bloodshed. Tadeusz Kościuszko, the great Polish freedom fighter, had his moments of glory but the people could not hold off the foreign attackers indefinitely. The battles reached Warsaw during Holy Week of 1794. The Redemptorists, along with all the other residents of that city, found their lives to be in constant danger. Three bombs crashed through the roof of the church but did not explode. Throughout the battles, Hofbauer and his companions preached peace. This only served to increase the cries of protest against the Redemptorists, who were already labeled as traitors. In 1806 a law was passed that forbade local pastors to invite the Redemptorists to preach missions in their parishes. This was followed by an even-more restrictive law that stopped the Redemptorists from preaching and hearing confessions in their own church of St. Benno's.

Hofbauer appealed these actions directly to the King, Frederick Augustus I of Saxony, who ruled Poland (known as the Duchy of Warsaw at that time). While the king knew the good that the Redemptorists were doing, he was powerless to stop those who wanted the Redemptorists out of Poland. The decree of expulsion was signed on 9 June 1808. Eleven days later, the Church of St. Benno's was closed and the 40 Redemptorists serving there were taken off to prison. They lived there for four weeks and then were ordered to return to their own countries.

Vienna

In September 1808, after being exiled from Poland, Hofbauer reached Vienna. He remained there until his death almost 13 years later. In 1809, when the forces of Napoleon attacked Vienna, Hofbauer worked as a hospital chaplain caring for the many wounded soldiers. The archbishop, seeing Hofbauer's zeal, asked him to care for a little Italian church in the city of Vienna. He remained there for four years until he was appointed chaplain to the Ursuline Sisters in July 1813. Attending to the spiritual welfare of the Sisters and the lay people who came to their chapel, Hofbauer gained a reputation as a powerful preacher and gentle confessor.

In the early days of the 19th century, Vienna was a major European cultural center. Hofbauer enjoyed spending time with the students and the intellectuals. Students came, singly and in groups, to his quarters to talk, share a meal, or get advice. A good many of them later became Redemptorists. He brought many rich and artistic people into the Church, including Karl Wilhelm Friedrich Schlegel and Dorothea von Schlegel (she was the daughter of the philosopher Moses Mendelssohn); Friedrich August von Klinkowström, the artist; Joseph von Pilat, the private secretary of Metternich; Zacharias Werner, who was later ordained and became a great preacher; and Frederick von Held, who became a Redemptorist and later spread the Congregation as far as Ireland.

That the plan of Wessenberg to establish a German national church failed, was chiefly due to Clement Hofbauer. Later in Vienna, Hofbauer again found himself under attack, and for a short time was prohibited from preaching. Then he was threatened with expulsion because he had been communicating with his Redemptorist Superior General in Rome. Before the expulsion could become official, Emperor Franz of Austria would have to sign it. At the time, the Emperor was on pilgrimage to Rome, where he visited Pope Pius VII and learned how greatly the work of Hofbauer was appreciated. He also learned that he could reward Hofbauer for his years of dedicated service by allowing him to start a Redemptorist foundation in Austria.

So, instead of a writ of expulsion, Hofbauer got an audience with Emperor Franz. A church was selected and refurbished to become the first Redemptorist foundation in Austria. It was to be started without Hofbauer, however. He became ill in early March 1820, and died on March 15 of that year.

Veneration

Hofbauer was beatified on 29 January 1888 by Pope Leo XIII, and canonized on 20 May 1909 by Pope Pius X. His liturgical feast is celebrated on 15 March.

A few months after Hofbauer's canonization, a parish church was established under his patronage at West 44th Street and 10th Avenue in New York City, which served the Polish community of the city. It was closed in the late 1960s. Two years later, in 1911, the St.-Clemens-Kirche was established in Berlin.

Remembrance
Hofbauer is one of the figures immortalized in Jan Matejko's 1891 painting, Constitution of 3 May 1791.

Gallery

Notes

External links 
 

1751 births
1820 deaths
People from Znojmo District
People from the Margraviate of Moravia
19th-century Austrian Roman Catholic priests
Bakers
Czech hermits
19th-century Czech Roman Catholic priests
Czech Roman Catholic saints
18th-century Austrian Roman Catholic priests
Austrian Roman Catholic saints
Redemptorist saints
Beatifications by Pope Leo XIII
Canonizations by Pope Pius X
18th-century Christian saints
19th-century Christian saints
Austrian people of Moravian-German descent
Austrian people of Czech descent